Spirited is an Australian television supernatural comedy-drama series made for subscription television channel W that aired for two seasons, 2010 and 2011.

The series stars Claudia Karvan as dentist Suzy Darling, who walks away from a loveless marriage and into an old apartment block that is inhabited by the ghost of a 1980s English rock star, Henry Mallet, played by Matt King. Suzy had been married to Steve Darling, played by Rodger Corser, for 15 years, and they have two children, Elvis, 13, played by Louis Fowler, and Verity, 8, played by Charlie Hancock. Belinda Bromilow plays Suzy's sister Jonquil.

Cast

Main cast
Claudia Karvan as Suzy Darling
Matt King as Henry Mallet
Rodger Corser as Steve Darling
Belinda Bromilow as Jonquil Payne
Louis Fowler as Elvis Darling
Charlie Hancock as Verity Darling
Angus Sampson as Zac Hannigan

Recurring cast
Jane Harders as Rita
Russell Dykstra as Adam One (Season 1)
Paul Gleeson as Terry
Sarah Snook as Antonia (Season 2)
Yael Stone as Linda

Series 

Claudia Karvan stars as dentist Suzy Darling, who walks away from her husband Steve Darling (Rodger Corser) of 15 years and their loveless marriage and into an old apartment block that is inhabited by the ghost of Henry Mallet (Matt King), a 1980s English rock star. Suzy also has two children, thirteen-year-old son Elvis (Louis Fowler) and eight-year-old daughter Verity (Charlie Hancock), along with a sister Jonquil (Belinda Bromilow).

It is revealed that although Suzy is the only living human being able to see Henry, animals, such as the resident cat, can sense his presence. However, in one scene Henry frightens the caretaker into a heart attack by blowing into his ear.

Spirited is produced by John Edwards, Claudia Karvan and Jacquelin Perske who also created drama series Love My Way.

Cancellation 
On 15 October 2011, W announced that it had canceled Spirited and that there would be no third series. Immediately following this announcement, fans launched a campaign to have the show renewed, using the slogan  "SOS: Save Our Spirited". It was announced on 16 December that a possible development deal had been reached with another Australian premium cable channel, Showcase, for a third series. However, with Claudia Karvan being cast in a Puberty Blues reboot, the likelihood of a third series was slim. Spirited was not picked up for a third season.

Reception 
Jo Curtis at UnrealityTV.com found the pilot "funny; it’s very funny, but probably only if you have a sense of humour that tends towards black", and described the comedy and Karvan's character transformation as "a breath of fresh air."

The first season was "Foxtel's most successful Australian drama." Although the target audience was "women in their 40s", it also gained the interest of male teenagers, for the "punk character" of Henry Mallet, according to Karvan.

In a video review, Doug Anderson (The Age/The Guide) and Lenny Ann Low (SMH) described the series as "very engaging", and "quality drama" with no problems in its style, substance or ideas.

The Age reviewer Brad Newsome described the second-season premiere as "just as imaginative and funny as any that has gone before."  In the week following, Newsome described the show as "one of the most imaginative things on TV, blending romance, drama and comedy into a wonderfully satisfying whole."

Awards and nominations
The seventh episode in the first series, "Riders on the Storm", written by Jacquelin Perske (writer of the film Little Fish), was one of three nominees for the 2011 Australian Writers Guild AWGIE Award for best scriptwriting in a television series.

Season 2 of Spirited was nominated for 'Best Television Drama Series' at the 2012 AACTA (Australian Academy of Cinema and Television Arts) awards.

Home video releases

References

External links
 
 Official Facebook 
 Spirited-TV.net Fan site

Australian drama television series
2010 Australian television series debuts
2011 Australian television series endings
Television series by Endemol Australia
Romantic fantasy television series
Ghosts in television
Television shows set in Sydney